The July Monarchy, officially the Kingdom of France, was a liberal constitutional monarchy in France under , starting on 26 July 1830, with the July Revolution of 1830, and ending 23 February 1848, with the Revolution of 1848. It marks the end of the Bourbon Restoration (1814–1830). It began with the overthrow of the conservative government of Charles X, the last king of the House of Bourbon.
 
The king promised to follow the juste milieu, or the middle-of-the-road, avoiding the extremes of both the conservative supporters of Charles X and radicals on the left.

The July Monarchy was dominated by wealthy bourgeoisie and numerous former Napoleonic officials. The king promoted friendship with the United Kingdom and sponsored colonial expansion, notably the French conquest of Algeria. By 1848, a year in which many European states had a revolution, the king's popularity had collapsed, and he was overthrown.

Overview

 was pushed to the throne by an alliance between the people of Paris; the republicans, who had set up barricades in the capital; and the liberal bourgeoisie. However, at the end of his reign, the so-called "Citizen King" was overthrown by similar citizen uprisings and use of barricades during the February Revolution of 1848. This resulted in the proclamation of the Second Republic.

After 's ousting and subsequent exile to Britain, the liberal Orleanist faction (opposed by the counter-revolutionary Legitimists) continued to support a return of the House of Orléans to the throne. But the July Monarchy proved to be the last Bourbon-Orleans monarchy of France (although monarchy was re-established under Napoleon Bonaparte's nephew, who reigned as Napoleon III from 1852 to 1870). The Legitimists withdrew from politics to their castles, leaving the way open for the struggle between the Orleanists and the Republicans.

The July Monarchy (1830–1848) is generally seen as a period during which the haute bourgeoisie was dominant, and marked the shift from the counter-revolutionary Legitimists to the Orleanists. They were willing to make some compromises with the changes brought by the 1789 Revolution. For instance,  was crowned "King of the French", instead of "King of France": this marked his acceptance of popular sovereignty.

, who had flirted with liberalism in his youth, rejected much of the pomp and circumstance of the Bourbons and surrounded himself with merchants and bankers. The July Monarchy, however, ruled during a time of turmoil. A large group of Legitimists on the right demanded the restoration of the Bourbons to the throne. On the left, Republicanism and, later Socialism, remained a powerful force. Late in his reign  became increasingly rigid and dogmatic and his President of the Council, had become deeply unpopular, but the king refused to remove him. The situation gradually escalated until the Revolutions of 1848 resulted in the fall of the monarchy and the establishment of the Second Republic.

However, during the first few years of his reign,  was taking action to develop legitimate, broad-based reform. The government found its source of legitimacy within the Charter of 1830, written by reform-minded members of Chamber of Deputies and committed to a platform of religious equality among Catholics and Protestants; the empowerment of the citizenry through the reestablishment of the National Guard, electoral reform, and reform of the peerage system; and the lessening of royal authority.  and his ministers adhered to policies that seemed to promote the central tenets of the constitution. However, the majority of these policies were veiled attempts to shore up the power and influence of the government and the bourgeoisie, rather than legitimate attempts to promote equality and empowerment for a broad constituency of the French population. Thus, though the July Monarchy seemed to move toward reform, this movement was largely illusory.

During the years of the July Monarchy, enfranchisement roughly doubled, from 94,000 under Charles X to more than 200,000 men by 1848. But, this number still represented only roughly one percent of population and a small number of those men of eligible age. As the qualifications for voting was related to payment of a certain level of taxes, only the wealthiest men gained this privilege. The extended franchise tended to favor the wealthy merchant bourgeoisie more than any other group. Beyond resulting in the election of more bourgeoisie to the Chamber of Deputies, this electoral expansion meant that the bourgeoisie could politically challenge the nobility on legislative matters. Thus, while appearing to honor his pledge to increase suffrage,  acted primarily to empower his supporters and increase his hold over the French Parliament. The election of only the wealthiest men tended to undermine any possibility for growth of a radical faction in Parliament, and effectively served socially conservative ends.

The reformed Charter of 1830 limited the power of the king—stripping him of his ability to propose and decree legislation, as well as limiting his executive authority. However,  believed in a kind of monarchy in which the king was more than a figurehead for an elected Parliament, and as such, he was deeply involved in legislative affairs. One of his first acts in creating his government was to appoint the conservative  as the premier of his cabinet. , a banker, was instrumental in shutting down many of the Republican secret societies and labor unions that had formed during the early years of the regime. In addition, he oversaw the dismemberment of the National Guard after it proved too supportive of radical ideologies. He conducted these actions, of course, with royal approval. He was once quoted as saying that the source of French misery was the belief that there had been a revolution. "No ," he said to another minister, "there has not been a revolution: there is simply a change at the head of state." 

The regime acknowledged early on that radicalism and republicanism threatened it, as they undermined its  policies. In 1834 the Monarchy declared the term "republican" illegal.  shut down republican clubs and disbanded republican publications. Distrusting the National Guard,  increased the size of the army and reformed it in order to ensure its loyalty to the government.

Though two factions always persisted in the cabinet, split between liberal conservatives such as Guizot (the Party of Resistance) and liberal reformers such as the journalist  (the Party of Movement), the latter never gained prominence.  was succeeded as premier by Count Molé, another conservative. Thiers, a reformer, succeeded  but was later sacked by Louis-Philippe after attempting to pursue an aggressive foreign policy. After Thiers the conservative  was selected as premier.

In particular, the  administration was marked by increasingly authoritarian crackdowns on republicanism and dissent, and an increasingly pro-business policy. This policy included protective tariffs that defended the status quo and enriched French businessmen. 's government granted railway and mining contracts to the bourgeois supporters of the government, and contributed some of the start-up costs of these enterprises. 's advice to those who were disenfranchised by the tax-based electoral requirements was "" (enrich yourselves).

Background

The ensuing period, the Bourbon Restoration, was characterized by conservative reaction and the re-establishment of the Roman Catholic Church as a power in French politics. The relatively moderate , brother of the deposed-and-executed Louis XVI, ruled as Louis XVIII from 1814 to 1824 and was succeeded by his more conservative younger brother, the former , ruling as Charles X from 1824.

The egalitarianism and liberalism of the revolutionaries remained an important force and the autocracy and hierarchy of the earlier era could not be fully restored. Economic changes, which had been underway long before the revolution, had progressed further during the years of turmoil and were firmly entrenched by 1815. These changes had seen power shift from the noble landowners to the urban merchants. The administrative reforms of Napoleon, such as the Napoleonic Code and efficient bureaucracy, also remained in place. These changes produced a unified central government that was fiscally sound and had much control over all areas of French life, a sharp difference from the complicated mix of feudal and absolutist traditions and institutions of pre-Revolutionary Bourbons.

Louis XVIII, for the most part, accepted that much had changed. Louis XVIII was forced to dissolve this Chamber, dominated by the Ultras, in 1816, fearing a popular uprising. His brother Charles X, however, took a far more conservative approach. He attempted to compensate the aristocrats for what they had lost in the revolution, curbed the freedom of the press, and reasserted the power of the Church. In 1830 the discontent caused by these changes and Charles' authoritarian nomination of the Ultra  as minister culminated in an uprising in the streets of Paris, known as the 1830 July Revolution. Louis-Philippe ruled, not as "King of France" but as "King of the French" (an evocative difference for contemporaries).

Initial period (August 1830 – November 1830)

The symbolic establishment of the new regime 

On 7 August 1830, the 1814 Charter was revised. The new Charter was a compromise between the  opposition to Charles X and the Republicans. Laws enforcing Catholicism and censorship were repealed and the revolutionary tricolor flag re-established.

Louis-Philippe pledged his oath to the 1830 Charter on 9 August setting up the beginnings of the July Monarchy. Two days later, the first cabinet was formed, gathering the Constitutionalist opposition to Charles X, including , the banker , Count Molé, the duke of Broglie, etc. The new government's first aim was to restore public order, while at the same time appearing to acclaim the revolutionary forces which had just triumphed. Assisted by the people of Paris in overthrowing the Legitimists, the Orleanist bourgeoisie had to establish its new order.

Louis-Philippe decided on 13 August 1830 to adopt the arms of the House of Orléans as state symbols. Reviewing a parade of the Parisian National Guard on 29 August which acclaimed the adoption, he exclaimed to its leader, Lafayette: "This is worth more to me than coronation at Reims!". The new regime then decided on 11 October that all people injured during the revolution (500 orphans, 500 widows and 3,850 people injured) would be given financial compensation and presented a draft law indemnifying them in the amount of 7 million francs, also creating a commemorative medal for the July Revolutionaries.

The new king's older son, was given the title of duke of Orléans and Prince Royal, while his daughters and his sister, were named princesses of Orléans – and not of France, since there was no longer any "King of France" nor "House of France."

Unpopular laws passed during the Restoration were repealed, including the 1816 amnesty law which had banished the regicides – with the exception of article 4, concerning the Bonaparte family. Various budget restrictions were imposed on the Catholic Church, while the 1825 Anti-Sacrilege Act which envisioned death penalties for sacrilege was repealed.

A permanent disorder 
Civil unrest continued for three months, supported by the left-wing press. 's government was not able to put an end to it, mostly because the National Guard was headed by one of the Republican leaders, the marquis de La Fayette, who advocated a "popular throne surrounded by Republican institutions." The Republicans then gathered themselves in popular clubs, in the tradition established by the 1789 Revolution. Strikes and demonstrations were permanent.

In order to stabilize the economy and finally secure public order, in the autumn of 1830 the government had the Assembly vote a credit of 5 million francs to subsidize public works, mostly roads. Then, to prevent bankruptcies and the increase of unemployment, especially in Paris, the government issued a guarantee for firms encountering difficulties, granting them 60 million francs. These subsidies mainly went into the pockets of big entrepreneurs aligned with the new regime, such as the printer .

It is however commonly accepted that the Prince died as a result of sex games with his mistress, the baroness .

Purge of the Legitimists 

Meanwhile, the government expelled from the administration all Legitimist supporters who refused to pledge allegiance to the new regime, leading to the return to political affairs of most of the personnel of the First Empire, who had themselves been expelled during the Second Restoration. The Minister of the Interior, re-appointed the entire prefectoral administration and the mayors of large cities. The Minister of Justice, assisted by his secretary general, dismissed most of the public prosecutors. In the Chamber of Deputies, a quarter of the seats (119) were submitted to a new election in October, leading to the defeat of the Legitimists.

In sociological terms, however, this renewal of political figures did not mark any great change of elites. The old land-owners, civil servants and liberal professions continued to dominate the state of affairs, leading the historian David H. Pinkney to deny any claim of a "new regime of a ".

The "Resistance" and the "Movement" 
Although some voices began to push for the closure of the Republican clubs, which fomented revolutionary agitation, the Minister of Justice, and the Parisian public prosecutor, Bernard, both Republicans, refused to prosecute revolutionary associations (the French law prohibited meetings of more than 20 persons).

However, on 25 September 1830, the Minister of Interior  responded to a deputy's question on the subject by stigmatizing the "revolutionary state", which he conflated with chaos, to which he opposed the "Glorious Revolution" in England in 1688.

Two political currents thereafter made their appearance, and would structure political life under the July Monarchy: the Movement Party and the Resistance Party. The first was reformist and in favor of support to the nationalists who were trying, all over of Europe, to shake the grip of the various Empires in order to create nation-states. The second was conservative and supported peace with European monarchs, and had as mouthpiece .

The trial of Charles X's ministers, arrested in August 1830 while they were fleeing, became the major political issue. Thus, on 27 September 1830 the Chamber of Deputies passed a resolution charging the former ministers, but at the same time, in an address to king  on 8 October, invited him to present a draft law repealing the death penalty, at least for political crimes. This in turn provoked popular discontent on 17 and 18 October, with the masses marching on the Fort of Vincennes where the ministers were detained.

Following these riots, Interior Minister Guizot requested the resignation of the prefect of the Seine, who had criticized the parliamentarians' address to the king. Confronted to the 's defeat,  decided to put  to trial, hoping that the exercise of power would discredit him. He thus called him to form a new government on 2 November 1830.

The  government (2 November 1830 – 13 March 1831) 

Although Louis-Philippe strongly disagreed with the banker  and secretly pledged to the duke of Broglie that he would not support him at all, the new President of the Council was tricked into trusting his king.

The trial of Charles X's former ministers took place from 15 to 21 December 1830 before the Chamber of Peers, surrounded by rioters demanding their death. 's National Guard maintained public order in Paris, affirming itself as the bourgeois watchdog of the new regime, while the new Interior Minister, kept the ministers safe by detaining them in the fort of Vincennes.

But by demonstrating the National Guard's importance,  had made his position delicate, and he was quickly forced to resign. This led to the Minister of Justice 's resignation. In order to avoid exclusive dependence on the National Guard, the "Citizen King" charged , the new Minister of War, with reorganizing the Army. In February 1831,  presented his project, aiming to increase the military's effectiveness. Among other reforms, the project included the 9 March 1831 law creating the Foreign Legion.

The 21 March 1831 law on municipal councils reestablished the principle of election and enlarged the electorate (founded on census suffrage) which was thus increased tenfold in comparison with the legislative elections (approximately 2 to 3 million electors from a total population of 32,6 million). The 22 March 1831 law re-organized the National Guard; the 19 April 1831 law, voted after two months of debate in Parliament and promulgated after 's downfall, decreased the electoral income level from 300 to 200 francs and the level for eligibility from 1,000 to 500 francs. The number of voters thereby increased from less than 100,000 to 166,000: one Frenchman in 170 possessed the right to vote, and the number of constituencies rose from 430 to 459.

The February 1831 riots 

Despite these reforms, which targeted the bourgeoisie rather than the people, Paris was once again rocked by riots on 14 and 15 February 1831, leading to 's downfall. The immediate cause of the riots was a funeral service organized by the Legitimists at  Church in memory of the ultra-royalist duke of Berry, assassinated in 1820. The commemoration turned into a political demonstration in favor of the count of Chambord, Legitimist pretender to the throne. Seeing in this celebration an intolerable provocation, the Republican rioters ransacked the church two days in a row, before turning on other churches. The revolutionary movement spread to other cities.

Confronted with renewed unrest, the government abstained from any strong repression. The prefect of the Seine , the prefect of police , and the new commandant of the National Guard, General , remained passive, triggering 's indignation, as well as the Republican 's criticisms against the demagogy of the government.

With obvious displeasure,  finally signed the 16 February 1831 ordinance substituting for the arms of the House of Orléans a shield with an open book, on which could be read "". The , was also removed from public buildings, etc. This new defeat of the king sealed 's fate.

On 19 February 1831,  verbally attacked  in the Chamber of Deputies, daring him to dissolve the Chamber and present himself before the electors.  accepted, but the king, who was the only one entitled to dissolve the Chamber, preferred to wait a few days more. To make matters worse, in this insurrectionary climate, the economic situation was fairly bad.

 finally tricked  into resigning by having his Minister of Foreign Affairs, pass him a note written by the French ambassador to Vienna, Marshal Maison, and which had arrived in Paris on 4 March 1831, which announced an imminent Austrian intervention in Italy. After a meeting with the king,  submitted to the Council of Ministers a belligerent program, and was subsequently disavowed, forcing him to resign. Most of his ministers had already negotiated their positions in the forthcoming government.

The  government (13 March 1831 – 16 May 1832)

However,  was not really much more comfortable with one side than with the other, being closer to the center. Furthermore, he felt no sympathy for its leader, the banker , who replaced  on 13 March 1831 as head of the government. His aim was more to re-establish order in the country, letting the  assume responsibility for unpopular measures.

, however, managed to impose his conditions on the king, including the pre-eminence of the President of the Council over other ministers, and his right to call cabinet councils outside of the actual presence of the king. Furthermore,  secured agreement that the liberal Prince Royal, would cease to participate to the Council of Ministers.

The banker  established the new government's principles on 18 March 1831: ministerial solidarity and the authority of the government over the administration: "the principle of the July Revolution... is not insurrection... it is resistance to the aggression the power" and, internationally, "a pacific attitude and the respect of the non-intervention principle." The vast majority of the Chamber applauded the new government and granted him a comfortable majority.  harnessed the support of the cabinet through oaths of solidarity and strict discipline for dissenters. He excluded reformers from official discourse, and abandoned the regime's unofficial policy of mediating in labor disputes in favor of a strict laissez-faire policy that favored employers.

Civil unrest (Canut Revolt) and repression 

On 14 March 1831, on the initiative of a patriotic society created by the mayor of Metz, the opposition's press launched a campaign to gather funds to create a national association aimed at struggling against any Bourbon Restoration and the risks of foreign invasion. All the major figures of the Republican Left (etc.) supported it. Local committees were created all over France, leading the new president of the Council, to issue a circular prohibiting civil servants from membership of this association, which he accused of challenging the state itself by implicitly accusing it of not fulfilling its proper duties.

In the beginning of April 1831, the government took some unpopular measures, forcing several important personalities to resign:  was dismissed from the Council of State, General 's military command suppressed,  and the  forced to resign. When on 15 April 1831 the  acquitted several young Republicans (and 's son), mostly officers of the National Guard who had been arrested during the December 1830 troubles following the trial of Charles X's ministers, new riots acclaimed the news on 15–16 April. But , implementing the 10 April 1831 law outlawing public meetings, used the military as well as the National Guard to dissolve the crowds. In May, the government used fire hoses as crowd control techniques for the first time.

The riots continued on 15 and 16 June.

The major unrest, however, took place in Lyon with the Canuts Revolt, started on 21 November 1831, and during which parts of the National Guard took the demonstrators' side. In two days, the Canuts took control of the city and expelled  and the mayor . On 25 November  announced to the Chamber of Deputies that , assisted by the Prince Royal, would immediately march on Lyon with 20,000 men. They entered the city on 3 December re-establishing order without any bloodshed.

Civil unrest, however, continued, and not only in Paris. On 11 March 1832, sedition exploded in Grenoble during the carnival. The prefect had canceled the festivities after a grotesque mask of  had been displayed, leading to popular demonstrations. The prefect then tried to have the National Guard disperse the crowd, but the latter refused to go, forcing him to call on the army. The 35th regiment of infantry obeyed the orders, but this in turn led the population to demand their expulsion from the city. This was done on 15 March and the 35th regiment was replaced by the 6th regiment, from Lyon. When  learnt the news, he dissolved the National Guard of Grenoble and immediately recalled the 35th regiment to the city.

Even the trials of suspects were seized on by the Republicans as an opportunity to address the people: at the trial of the Blanquist  in January 1832,  harshly criticized the king while  gave free vein to his socialist ideas. All of the accused denounced the government's tyranny, the incredibly high cost of Louis-Philippe's civil list, police persecutions, etc. The strength of the opposition led the Prince Royal to shift his view somewhat further to the right.

Legislative elections of 1831 

In the second half of May 1831, accompanied by Marshal Soult, started an official visit to Normandy and Picardy, where he was well received. There, in the name of the municipal council, the mayor made a very political speech in which he expressed the wish to have peerages abolished, adding that France should intervene in Poland to assist the November Uprising against Russia. Louis-Philippe flatly rejected all of these aspirations, stating that the municipal councils and the National Guard had no standing in such matters.

However, he signed another ordinance on 23 June in Colmar in order to have the elections put back to 23 July 1831, so as to avoid the risk of Republican agitation during the commemorations of the July Revolution. The general election of 1831 took place without incident, according to the new electoral law of 19 April 1831. However, the results disappointed the king and the president of the Council, : more than half of the outgoing deputies were re-elected, and their political positions were unknown. The Legitimists obtained 104 seats, the Orleanist Liberals 282 and the Republicans 73.

On 23 July 1831, the king set out 's program in the speech from the Throne: strict application of the Charter at home and strict defense of the interests of France and its independence abroad.

The deputies in the chamber then voted for their President, electing , the government's candidate, on the second round. He gained 181 votes to the banker 's 176. But  gained the first vice presidency with 182 voices out of a total of 344, defeating the government's candidate, who had only 153 votes. , who considered that his parliamentary majority was not strong enough, decided to resign.

 thereafter turned towards , who refused to assume governmental responsibilities, pointing out that he had only a hundred deputies in the Chamber. Finally, William I of the Netherlands's decision to invade Belgium – the Belgian Revolution had taken place the preceding year – on 2 August 1831, constrained  to remain in power in order to respond to the Belgians' request for help.

However, at the domestic level,  decided to back down before the dominant opposition, and satisfied an old demand of the Left by abolishing hereditary peerages.

The 1832 cholera epidemic 
The cholera pandemic that originated in India in 1815 reached Paris around 20 March 1832 and killed more than 13,000 people in April. The pandemic would last until September 1832, killing in total 100,000 in France, with 20,000 in Paris alone. The disease, the origins of which were unknown at the time, provoked a popular panic. The people of Paris suspected poisoners, while scavengers and beggars revolted against the authoritarian measures of public health.

According to the 20th-century historian and philosopher , the cholera outbreak was first fought by what he called "social medicine", which focused on flux, circulation of air, location of cemeteries, etc. All of these concerns, born of the miasma theory of disease, were thus concerned with urbanist concerns of the management of populations.

He resigned his ministerial activities before dying of cholera on 16 May 1832.

Consolidation of the regime (1832–1835)
The "Citizen King" was therefore not in any hurry to find a new President of the Council, all the more since the Parliament was in recess and that the troubled situation demanded swift and energetic measures.

Indeed, the regime was being attacked on all sides. General Mouton crushed the rebellion. (Victor Hugo later described the scene in his 1862 novel Les Misérables.)

This double victory, over both the Carlist (pro-Charles X) Legitimists and the Republicans, was a success for the July Monarchy regime. Furthermore, the death of the duke of Reichstadt (Napoléon II) on 22 July 1832, in Vienna, marked another setback for the Bonapartist opposition.

Finally,  married his elder daughter, to the newly-appointed king of the Belgians,  Leopold I, on the anniversary of the establishment of the July Monarchy (9 August). This royal alliance strengthened 's position abroad.

First Soult government 
The conservative  spoke of a "coalition of all talents", while the King of the French would eventually speak, with obvious disappointment, of a " in three persons".

The duchess was then expelled to Palermo in the Kingdom of the Two Sicilies on 8 June 1833.

The opening of the parliamentary session on 19 November 1832, was a success for the regime. The governmental candidate, was easily elected on the first round as President of the Chamber, with 234 votes against 136 for the candidate of the opposition, .

In Belgium, Marshal  assisted the young Belgian monarchy with 70,000 men, taking back the citadel of Antwerp, which capitulated on 23 December 1832.

Strengthened by these recent successes,  initiated two visits to the provinces, first into the north to meet with the victorious Marshal  and his men, and then into Normandy, where Legitimist troubles continued, from August to September 1833. The  Minister of Public Instruction and Cults, had the famous  law on primary education passed in June 1833, leading to the creation of an elementary school in each commune.

Finally, a ministerial change was enacted after the duke 's resignation on 1 April 1834.  had found himself in a minority in the Chamber concerning the ratification of a treaty signed with the United States in 1831. This was a source of satisfaction for the king, as it removed from the triumvirate the individual he disliked the most.

April 1834 insurrections 
The ministerial change coincided with the return of violent unrest in various cities of France. At the end of February 1834, a new law that subjected the activities of town criers to public authorization led to several days of confrontations with the police. Furthermore, the 10 April 1834 law, primarily aimed against the Republican Society of the Rights of Man, envisioned a crack-down on non-authorized associations. On 9 April 1834, when the Chamber of Peers was to vote on the law, the Second Canut Revolt exploded in Lyon. The Minister of the Interior, decided to abandon the city to the insurgents, taking it back on 13 April with casualties of 100 to 200 dead on both sides.

The greater danger to the regime was, as often, in Paris. Expecting trouble,  had concentrated 40,000 men there, who were visited by the king on 10 April. Furthermore,  had made  "preventive arrests" of 150 principal leaders of the Society of the Rights of Man and outlawed its mouthpiece, . Despite these measures, barricades were set up in the evening of 13 April 1834, leading to harsh repression, including a massacre of all the inhabitants (men, women, children and old people) of a house from where a shot had been fired.

To express their support for the monarchy, both Chambers gathered in the Palace of the Tuileries on 14 April. In a gesture of appeasement,  canceled his feast-day celebration on 1 May, and publicly announced that the sums that were to have been used for these festivities would be dedicated to the orphans, widows and injured. In the same time, he ordered Marshal  to publicize these events widely across France (the provinces being more conservative than Paris), to convince them of the "necessary increase in the Army".

More than 2,000 arrests were made following the riots, in particular in Paris and Lyon. The cases were referred to the Chamber of Peers, which, in accordance with art. 28 of the Charter of 1830, dealt with cases of conspiracy against state security. As early as 13 May the Chamber of Deputies voted a credit of 14 million in order to increase the army to 360,000 men. Two days later, they also adopted a very repressive law on detention and use of military weapons.

Legislative elections of 1834 

Louis-Philippe decided to seize the opportunity of dissolving the Chamber and organizing new elections, which were held on 21 June 1834. Furthermore, a large majority (256 against 39) voted an ambiguous address to the king which, although polite, did not abstain from criticizing him. The latter immediately decided, on 16 August 1834, to prorogue Parliament until the end of the year.

Short-lived governments (July 1834 – February 1835)
Seizing the opportunity of an incident concerning the French possessions in Algeria, they pushed  to resign on 18 July 1834. He was replaced by Marshal , with the other ministers remaining in place.  however, was forced to resign in turn, on 29 October 1834, over the question of an amnesty for the 2,000 prisoners detained in April.

The latter, crippled with debts, became the object of public ridicule after his creditors decided to seize his ministerial salary. Alarmed, all the ministers decided to resign, three days later, without even advising , whose government became known as the "Three Days Ministry". This crisis made the  ridiculous while the  triumphed.

On 1 December 1834, 's government decided to submit a motion of confidence to the Parliament, obtaining a clear majority (184 votes to 117). Despite this,  had to resign two months later, on 20 February 1835, officially for health reasons. The opposition had denounced a government without a leader, accusing  of being 's puppet. The same phrase that  had spoken in opposition to Charles X, "the king reigns but does not rule", was now addressed to the "Citizen King".

Evolution towards parliamentarianism (1835–1840)
On the one hand,  wanted to be able to follow his own policy, in particular in "reserved domains" such as military affairs or diplomacy. As the head of state, he also wanted to be able to lead the government, if need be by bypassing the President of the Council. On the other hand, a number of the deputies stated that the ministers needed a leader commanding a parliamentary majority, and thus wanted to continue the evolution towards parliamentarism which had only been sketched out in the Charter of 1830. The Charter did not include any mechanism for the political accountability of ministers towards the Chamber (confidence motions or for censorship motions). Furthermore, the function of the President of the Council itself was not even set out in the Charter.

The  ministry (March 1835 – February 1836) 
In this context, the deputies decided to support  as head of the government, mainly because he was the king's least preferred choice, as  disliked both his anglophilia and his independence.

's first act was to take a personal revenge on the Chamber by having it ratify (by 289 votes against 137) the 4 July 1831 treaty with the United States, something which the deputies had refused him in 1834. He also obtained a large majority on the debate the secret funds, which worked as an unofficial motion of confidence (256 voices against 129).

Trial of the April insurgents 
's most important task was the trial of the April insurgents, which began on 5 May 1835 before the Chamber of Peers. The Peers finally convicted only 164 detainees on the 2,000 prisoners, of whom 43 were judged . Those defendants who were present for their trial introduced a great many procedural delays, and attempted by all means to transform the trial into a platform for Republicanism. On 12 July 1835, some of them, including the main leaders of the Parisian insurrection, escaped from the Prison of  through a tunnel. The Court of Peers delivered its sentence on the insurgents of Lyon on 13 August 1835, and on the other defendants in December 1835 and January 1836. The sentences were rather mild: a few condemnations to deportation, many short prison sentences and some acquittals.

The   (28 July 1835) 

Against their hopes, the trial finally turned to the Republicans' disadvantage, by giving them a radical image which reminded the public opinion of the excesses of Jacobinism and frightened the bourgeois.

However, Marshal Mortier and ten other persons were killed, while tens were injured (among which seven died in the following days).

The conspirators, the adventurer  and two Republicans ( and ) members of the Society of Human Rights, were arrested in September 1835. Judged before the Court of Peers, they were sentenced to death and guillotined on 19 February 1836.

The September laws 
The   shocked the bourgeoisie and most of France, which was generally more conservative than the people of Paris. The Republicans were discredited in the country, and public opinion was ready for strong measures against them.

It was adopted on 13 August 1835, by 212 votes to 72.

The second law reformed the procedure before the juries of the Assizes. The new law changed that to a simple majority (7 against 5), and was adopted on 20 August 1835 by 224 votes to 149.

The third law restricted freedom of press, and provoked passionate debates. Despite a strong opposition to the draft, the law was approved on 29 August 1835 by 226 votes to 153.

The final consolidation of the regime 
These three laws were simultaneously promulgated on 9 September 1835, and marked the final success of the policy of  pursued against the Republicans since . The July Monarchy was thereafter sure of its ground, with discussions concerning its legitimacy being completely outlawed. The Opposition could now only discuss the interpretation of the Charter and advocate an evolution towards parliamentarianism. Demands for the enlargement of the electoral base became more frequent, however, in 1840, leading to the re-appearance of Republican Opposition through the claim to universal suffrage.

The  ministry, however, finally fell on a question concerning the public debt. The Minister of Finance, announced on 14 January 1836 his intention to reduce the interest on government bonds in order to lighten the public debt, a very unpopular measure among the supporters of the regime, since bond interest was a fundamental component of the bourgeoisie's wealth. Therefore, the Council of Ministers immediately disavowed , while the Duke  explained to the Chamber that his proposal was not supported by the government. However, his tone was judged insulting by the deputies, and one of them, the banker , immediately proposed a draft law concerning bonds himself. On 5 February 1836, a narrow majority of deputies (194 against 192) decided to continue the examination of the draft, thus disavowing 's cabinet. The government immediately resigned: for the first time, a cabinet had fallen after having been put in a minority before the Chamber of Deputies, a sure victory of parliamentarianism.

The first  government (February – September 1836) 
Louis-Philippe then decided to pretend to play the parliamentary card, with the secret intention of neutralizing it. Furthermore, as the  himself warned him, when  was eventually pushed out, he would shift decisively to the Left and transform himself in a particularly dangerous opponent.

On the other hand, the draft proposal on government bonds was easily postponed by the deputies on 22 March 1836, another sign that it had been only a pretext.

Thiers' motivations for accepting the position of head of the government and taking the Ministry of Foreign Affairs as well were to enable him to negotiate the 's wedding with an Austrian archduchess. But Metternich and the archduchess Sophie of Bavaria, who dominated the court in Vienna, rejected an alliance with the House of Orléans, which they deemed too unstable.

These two setbacks upset .

To re-establish his popularity and in order to take his revenge on Austria,  was considering a military intervention in Spain, requested by the Queen Regent  who was confronted by the Carlist rebellion. This new event, in which the government had fallen not because of parliament but because of a disagreement with the king on foreign policy, demonstrated that the evolution towards parliamentarianism was far from being assured.

The two  governments (September 1836 – March 1839) 

This new cabinet did not include any veterans of the July Revolution, something the press immediately highlighted.  immediately took some humane measures in order to assure his popularity: the general adoption of small prison cells to avoid "mutual teaching of crime", abolition of chain gangs exposed to the public, and a royal pardon for 52 political prisoners (Legitimists and Republicans), in particular for Charles X' former ministers.

1836 Bonapartist uprising 
On 30 October 1836,  attempted an uprising in Strasbourg, which was quickly put down and the Bonapartist prince and his accomplices were arrested on the same day. The king, wanting to avoid a public trial, and without legal proceedings, ordered that  be taken to  where he was put on board the frigate , which sailed for the United States on 21 November.

The opposition adamantly rejected the proposal, and surprisingly managed to have the whole Chamber reject it, on 7 March 1837, by a very slim majority of 211 votes to 209.

However,  decided to go against public expectation, and the logic of parliamentarianism, by maintaining the  government in place. But the government was deprived of any solid parliamentary majority, and thus paralyzed.

The press spoke of a "Cabinet of the castle" or "Cabinet of lackeys", and all expected it to be short-lived.

The wedding of the Duke of Orléans 
However, in his first speech, on 18 April 1837,  cut short his critics with the announcement of the future wedding of Ferdinand Philippe, Duke of Orléans (styled as the ) with the Duchess Helene of Mecklenburg-Schwerin. Taken by surprise, the deputies voted for the increase of the dowry of both the Duke of Orléans, which had been previously rejected, and the Queen of the Belgians.

After this promising beginning, in May 's government managed to secure Parliament's confidence during the debate on the secret funds, despite 's attacks (250 votes to 112).

The king had closely followed and personally financed the project entrusted to the architect .

The legislative elections of 4 November 1837 

's government seemed stable, helped by the return of economic prosperity. Therefore, the king and  decided, against the 's advice, that the moment was auspicious for the dissolving of the Chamber, which was done on 3 October 1837.

However, the 4 November 1837 elections did not deliver 's hopes. Of a total of 459 deputies, only a plurality of 220 were supporters of the regime. About 20 Legitimists had been elected, and 30 Republicans. The center-right  had approximately 30 deputies, the center-left about twice that many, and the dynastic opposition 65. The  had only about 15 deputies, and 30 more were undecided. Such a Chamber carried the risk of the formation of a heterogeneous coalition against the government.

On 9 January he accused the government of electoral manipulation in order to have loyal civil servants elected. Where there had been 178 in the preceding Chamber, there were now 191.  and his allies also defied the government, concerning Spanish affairs.

The Peers, however, supported  and rejected the initiative. On 20 June 1838,  succeeded in having the Assembly pass the 1839 budget before the parliamentary recess.

The legislative elections of 2 March 1839 

Second Soult government (May 1839 – February 1840) 

Confronted with the ' refusal, he then tried to form a center-left cabinet, which also foundered upon 's intransigence concerning Spanish affairs. These successive setbacks forced the king to postpone to 4 April 1839 the opening of the parliamentary session. The king then attempted to keep him at bay by offering him an embassy, which provoked the outcries of 's friends. Finally,  resigned himself to composing, on 31 March 1839, a transitional and neutral government.

The parliamentary session opened on 4 April in a quasi-insurrectionary atmosphere. The left-wing press accused the government of provocations. Thiers supported  as President of the Chamber, but his attitude during the negotiations for the formation of a new cabinet had disappointed some of his friends. A part of the center-left thus decided to present  against . This vote demonstrated that the coalition had imploded, and that a right-wing majority could be formed to oppose any left-wing initiative.

Despite this, the negotiations for the formation of a new cabinet still were unsuccessful, with Thiers making his friends promise to request his authorization before accepting any governmental function. The League of the Just, founded in 1836, participated in this uprising. However, not only was it a failure, and the conspirators arrested, but this allowed  to form a new government on the same day, presided over by Marshal  who had assured him of his loyal support.

At the end of May, the vote on the secret funds gave a large majority to the new government, which also had the budget passed without any problems. The parliamentary recess was decreed on 6 August 1838, and the new session opened on 23 December, during which the Chamber voted a rather favorable address to the government by 212 votes to 43.

The second  cabinet (March – October 1840) 

's fall compelled the king to call on the main left-wing figure, . , one of the only remaining right-wing alternatives, had just been named ambassador to London and left France. 's aim was to definitively establish parliamentary government, with a "king who reigns but does not rule", and a cabinet drawn from the parliamentary majority and answerable to it. Henceforth, he clearly opposed 's concept of government.

 formed his government on 1 March 1840. His cabinet was composed of fairly young politicians (47 years old on average),  himself being only 42.

Relations with the king were immediately difficult.  embarrassed  by suggesting that he nominate his friend  as Marshal, which would expose him to the same criticisms he had previously suffered over political favoritism and the abuse of governmental power.  thus decided to postpone 's advancement.

 obtained an easy majority during the debate on the secret funds in March 1840 (246 votes to 160). Although he was classified as center-left, 's second government was highly conservative, and dedicated to the protection of the interests of the bourgeoisie. Although he had the deputies pass the vote on government bond conversion, which was a left-wing proposal, he was sure that it would be rejected by the Peers, which is what happened. On 16 May 1840,  harshly rejected universal suffrage and social reforms after a speech by the Radical , who had linked the ideas of electoral reform and social reform.  was attempting to unite the left-wing by tying together universal suffrage claims and Socialist claims, which had appeared in the 1840s, concerning the "right of work". He believed that electoral reform to establish universal suffrage should precede the social reform, which he considered very urgent.

On 15 June 1838,  obtained the postponement of a proposal made by the conservative deputy  who, equipping himself with an old demand of the Left, sought to outlaw the nomination of deputies to salaried public offices during their elective mandate. As Thiers had previously supported this proposition, he was acutely criticized by the Left.

Since the end of August 1838, social problems related to the economic crisis which started in 1839 caused strikes and riots in the textile, clothing and construction sectors. On 7 September 1839, the cabinet-makers of the  started to put up barricades.  responded by sending out the National Guard and invoking the laws prohibiting public meetings.

 also renewed the 's privilege until 1867 on such advantageous terms that the Bank had a commemorative gold medal cast. Several laws also established steamship lines, operated by companies operating state-subsidised concessions. Other laws granted credits or guarantees to railway companies in difficulties.

Return of Napoleon's ashes 

While  favored the conservative bourgeoisie, he also made sure to satisfy the Left's thirst for glory. With the British government's agreement, the  sailed to Saint Helena on the frigate  to retrieve them.

This announcement immediately struck a chord with public opinion, which was swept along with patriotic fervor. However, Bonaparte's operation was a complete failure, and he was detained with his men in the Fort of Ham, Picardy.

Their trial took place before the Chamber of Peers from 28 September 1840 to 6 October 1840, to general indifference. Defended by the famous Legitimist lawyer , Bonaparte was sentenced to life detention, by 152 votes (against 160 abstentions, out of a total of 312 Peers).

Colonization of Algeria 

, who would lead harsh repression against the natives, was officially nominated on 29 December 1840, a few days after 's fall.

Middle Eastern affairs, a pretext for 's fall 
 supported Mehemet Ali, the viceroy of Egypt, in his ambition to constitute a vast Arabian Empire from Egypt to Syria. He tried to intercede in order to have him sign an agreement with the Ottoman Empire, unbeknownst to the four other European powers (Britain, Austria, Prussia and Russia). However, informed of these negotiations, the British Minister of Foreign Affairs, Lord Palmerston, quickly negotiated a treaty between the four powers to sort out the "Eastern Question". When revealed, the London Convention of 15 July 1840 provoked an explosion of patriotic fury: France had been ousted from a zone where it traditionally exercised its influence, while Prussia, which had no interest in it, was associated with the treaty.

The latter pandered to patriotic feelings by decreeing, on 29 July 1840, a partial mobilization, and by starting, on 13 September 1840, the works on the fortifications of Paris. But France remained passive when, on 2 October 1840, the Royal Navy mobilized along the Lebanese coastline. Mehemet Ali was then immediately dismissed as viceroy by the Sultan.

Britain thereafter recognized Mehmet Ali's hereditary rule on Egypt: France had obtained a return to the situation of 1832. After a short discussion,  and his associates collectively presented their resignations to the king, who accepted them. On the following day,  sent for Marshal  and  so they could return to Paris as soon as possible.

The Guizot government (1840–1848)

But the new cabinet formed by  would remain closely knit, and finally win the king's trust, with  becoming his favorite president of the Council.

On 26 October 1840,  arrived to Paris from London. He took for himself the Ministry of Foreign Affairs and let Soult assume the nominal presidency. This satisfied the king and the royal family, while  himself was sure of his ability to manipulate the old Marshal  as he wished. As the center-left had refused to remain in the government, 's cabinet included only conservatives, ranging from the ministerial center to the center-right .

The July Column was erected in honor of the 1830 Revolution. The Middle East Question was settled by the London Straits Convention of 1841, which permitted the first reconciliation between France and Britain. This in turn increased public favor towards the colonization of Algeria.

Both the government and the Chamber were Orleanists.

Guizot refused any reforms, rejecting a broader franchise. According to him, the monarchy should favor the "middle classes", defined by land ownership, a "moral" tied to money, work and savings.  ("Get rich through work and savings and then you will be electors!") was his famous statement.  was helped in his aims by a comfortable rate of economic growth, averaging about 3.5% a year from 1840 to 1846. The transport network was quickly enlarged. An 1842 law organized the national railway network, which grew from 600 to 1,850 km, a sure sign that the Industrial Revolution had fully reached France.

A threatened system 

This period of Industrial Revolution was characterized by the appearance of a new social phenomenon, known as pauperism. Related to industrialization and the rural exodus, the working poor became an increasingly large segment of the population. Furthermore, the former network of workings men's associations of the  had disappeared. Workers had a 14-hour working day, daily wages of 20 centimes, and no possibility of organizing themselves in trade unions. 250,000 beggars were registered, and 3 million citizens registered with charity offices. State assistance was nonexistent. The only social law of the July Monarchy was to outlaw, in 1841, labor of children under eight years of age, and night labor for those of less than 13 years. The law, however, was almost never implemented.

Christians imagined a "charitable economy", while the ideas of Socialism, in particular Utopian Socialism (etc.) continued to spread.  theorized about Socialist , while the socialist and anarchist thinker  theorized about mutualism. On the other hand, Liberals, inspired by Adam Smith, imagined a  solution and the end of tariffs, which the United Kingdom, the dominant European power, had started in 1846 with the repeal of the Corn Laws.

Final years (1846–1848) 
The 1846 harvest was poor, in France as elsewhere (especially Ireland, but also Galicia and Bohemia). A rise in the price of wheat, the dietary staple of the common people, provoked a food shortage, while purchasing power decreased. The resulting fall in domestic consumption led to a crisis of industrial overproduction. This in turn immediately led to massive lay-offs, and thus to a large withdrawal of savings, leading to a banking crisis. Bankruptcies multiplied, and stock prices on the stock exchanges collapsed. The government reacted by importing Russian wheat, which created a negative balance of trade. The program of public works therefore stopped, including attempts to improve France's coastal defenses.

Robert Peel's government in Britain collapsed in 1846 after disputes over the Corn Laws, bringing the Liberals back into government led by Lord Russell and Lord Palmerston. The appointment of Lord Palmerston was regarded as a threat to France.

In , a city in the industrial north, 60% of the workers were unemployed. At the same time, the regime was marred by several political scandals ( corruption scandal, revealed in May 1847, or 's suicide after having murdered his wife, daughter of ).

Since the right of association was strictly restricted, and public meetings prohibited after 1835, the Opposition was paralyzed. In order to sidestep this law, political dissidents used civil funerals of their comrades as occasions of public demonstrations. Family celebrations and banquets also served as pretexts for gatherings. At the end of the regime, the  took place in all of the big cities of France.  firmly reacted to this threat, and prohibited the final banquet, which was to be held on 14 January 1848. Postponed to 22 February, this banquet would provoke the February 1848 Revolution.

End of the monarchy 

After some unrest, the king replaced  by  who advocated repression.

, who claimed to be the "Citizen King" linked to the country by a popular sovereignty contract on which he founded his legitimacy, did not see that the French people were advocating an enlargement of the electorate, either by a decrease of the electoral tax threshold, or by the establishment of universal suffrage .

Although the end of the July Monarchy brought France to the brink of civil war, the period was also characterized by an effervescence of artistic and intellectual creation.

Timeline of French constitutions

See also 
 France during the nineteenth century
 Liberalism and radicalism in France
 French art of the 19th century
 French literature of the 19th century
 History of science
 Politics of France

Notes

References

Further reading
 Antonetti, Guy. Louis-Philippe (Paris, Librairie Arthème Fayard, 2002), in French
 Aston, Nigel. "Orleanism, 1780–1830," History Today, (Oct 1988) 38#10, pp 41–47
 Beik, Paul. Louis Philippe and the July Monarchy (1965), short survey
 Blum, Jerome. In the Beginning: The Advent of the Modern Age Europe in the 1840s (1994) pp 199–234.
 Collingham, H.A.C. The July Monarchy: A Political History of France, 1830–1848 (Longman, 1988)
 Furet, François. Revolutionary France 1770-1880 (1995), pp 326–84. survey of political history by leading scholar
 Howarth, T.E.B. Citizen-King: The Life of Louis Philippe, King of the French (1962).
 Jardin, Andre, and Andre-Jean Tudesq. Restoration and Reaction 1815–1848 (The Cambridge History of Modern France) (1988)
 Lucas-Dubreton, J. The Restoration and the July Monarchy (1929), pp 174–368.
 Merriman, John M. ed. 1830 in France (1975) articles by scholars.
 Newman, Edgar Leon, and Robert Lawrence Simpson. Historical Dictionary of France from the 1815 Restoration to the Second Empire (Greenwood Press, 1987) online edition
 Pinkney, David. The French Revolution of 1830 (1972)
 Pinkney, David. Decisive Years in France, 1840-1847 (1986)

Cultural history
 Chu, Petra ten-Doesschate, and Gabriel P. Weisberg, eds. The popularization of images: Visual culture under the July Monarchy (Princeton University Press, 1994)
 Drescher, Seymour. "America and French Romanticism During the July Monarchy." American Quarterly (1959) 11#1 pp: 3-20. in JSTOR
 Margadant, Jo Burr. "Gender, Vice, and the Political Imaginary in Postrevolutionary France: Reinterpreting the Failure of the July Monarchy, 1830-1848," American Historical Review (1999) 194#5 pp. 1461–1496 in JSTOR
 Marrinan, Michael. Painting politics for Louis-Philippe: art and ideology in Orléanist France, 1830-1848 (Yale University Press, 1988)
 Mellon, Stanley. "The July Monarchy and the Napoleonic Myth." Yale French Studies (1960): 70–78. in JSTOR

Social and economic history
 Charle, Christophe. A Social History of France in the Nineteenth Century (1994)
 Harsin, Jill. Barricades: The War of the Streets in Revolutionary Paris, 1830-1848 (2002)
 Kalman, Julie. "The unyielding wall: Jews and Catholics in Restoration and July monarchy France." French historical studies (2003) 26#4 pp: 661–686.
 Pinkney, David H. "Laissez-Fair or Intervention? Labor Policy in the First Months of the July Monarchy." in French Historical Studies, Vol. 3. No. 1. (Spring, 1963), pp. 123–128.
 Price, Roger. A Social History of Nineteenth-Century France (1987) 403pp. 403 pgs. online edition
 Stearns, Peter N. "Patterns of industrial strike activity in France during the July Monarchy." American Historical Review (1965): 371–394. in JSTOR

 
Kingdom of France
1830s in France
1840s in France
French monarchy
Modern history of France
1830 establishments in France
1848 disestablishments in France
.
19th century in France